The 2021 Men's Pan American Challenge was the third edition of the Men's Pan American Challenge, the quadrennial qualification tournament for the Men's Pan American Cup organized by the Pan American Hockey Federation.

The tournament was held alongside the women's tournament in Lima, Peru from 26 September to 2 October 2021. The tournament was originally scheduled to be held from 27 June to 5 July 2020. Due to the COVID-19 pandemic, the tournament was postponed and on 4 February 2021 the current dates were announced. The top two teams qualified for the 2022 Men's Pan American Cup.

Results

Standings

Matches

Statistics

Final standings

Goalscorers

See also
2021 Women's Pan American Challenge

References

Men's Pan American Challenge
Pan American Challenge
International field hockey competitions hosted by Peru
Pan American Challenge
Pan American Challenge
Pan American Challenge
Pan American Challenge
Sports competitions in Lima
2020s in Lima